First Kiss is a 2014 American short film directed and produced by Tatia Pilieva.The film has music composed by Soko.

The project was born of PIlieva’s collection of photographs of herself and husband cinematographer Andre Lascaris kissing over the years of their relationship. It inspired the idea of capturing first kisses on film, and the idea came to life when Pilieva’s friend Melissa Coker, the fashion designer behind WREN, reached out about doing a film short to promote her Fall 2014 collection. Pilieva recruited 20 single friends, dressed in WREN, to meet and kiss for the first time on set as five cameras rolled continuously. Launched online on March 11, 2014, the three-and-a-half-minute short film went viral and as of May 17, 2014, had 59 million views.

Some backlash emerged when viewers learned the film was a clothing ad, although the company was mentioned in the opening and closing credits. WREN sales increased by almost 14,000 percent.

Cast
 Jill Larson
 Marianna Palka
 Soko
 Natalia Bonifacci
 Luke Cook
 Corby Griesenbeck
 Karim Saleh
 Ingrid Schram
 Nicole Simone
 Elisabetta Tedla

References

External links
 

2014 films
American drama films
2014 drama films
2014 short films
2010s English-language films
2010s American films